Indonesian Army Doctrine, Education and Training Development Command ( or ) is an Indonesian Army Principal Command which is directly under the office of the Chief of Staff of the Army and located in Bandung, West Java. Its principal responsibility is the training of all service personnel of the Army to fulfill its primary responsibilities of national defense and civil-military cooperation in national development.

Kodiklatad Task 
The main task of the Kodiklat is to provide guidance on the doctrine / system of terrestrial dimension operations, education and training of the TNI AD. To carry out these basic tasks, Kodiklat is empowered to perform

 Doctrine formation: Includes all work efforts and activities in the field of research and development of the Army Doctrine and the operational standards of the Army
 Educational training: Includes all business work and activities in the field of research and development of the military education system, organizing education except Educational activities in Seskoad, Akmil, Secapa, Pusdikpasus, Rindam, Instek and Akper as well as all educational work in the centers run by the command or are under nominal supervision of it
 Training development: Includes all business and work activities in the field of research and development of the TNI AD training system, organizing exercises in national, regional and local levels to ensure the preparedness of army personnel for the performance of their duties in national defense and civil disaster relief

History 
The founding of the Kodiklat, began with the establishment of the Infantry Directorate in 1950, then in 1951, it was changed to the Army Education Directorate, abbreviated as DPAD. Then in 1956 it was inaugurated as Inspectorate General of Education and Training which was perfected into KOPLAT. As the reorganization within the ABRI body was merged and formed into KOBANGDIKLAT, which was subsequently divivded into two commands, PUSBANGSISOPS and PUSBINDIK. PUSBANGSISOPS and PUSBINDIK are considered to be more effective if they are coordinated into one Unit so that through the Kasad Skep Number Skep / 454 / XI / 1994 dated November 17, 1994 the two formations were merged into the current Kodiklatad.

Directly reporting institutions 
The following institutions are operated under direct supervision of the Kodiklatad:
 Combat Operations Training Centre (Pusat Latihan Tempur TNI AD (Puslatpur TNI AD)) located in Baturaja
 Combat Simulation Centre (Pusat Simulasi Tempur TNI AD (Pussimpur TNI AD)) located in Bandung
 Army Branch Training Schools (Pusdik Kecabangan):
 Infantry Training School  (Pusat Pendidikan Infanteri (Pusdikif)) in Bandung
 Cavalry Training School (Pusat Pendidikan Kavaleri (Pusdikkav)) in Padalarang
 Air Defense Artillery Training School (Pusat Pendidikan Artileri Pertahanan Udara (Pusdikarhanud)) in Malang, East Java
 Field Artillery Training School (Pusat Pendidikan Artileri Medan (Pusdikarmed)) in Cimahi
 Women's Army Corps Training School (Pusat Pendidikan Korps Wanita TNI AD (Pusdikkowad)) in Lembang
 Finance Corps Training School (Pusat Pendidikan Keuangan (Pusdikku)) in Bandung
 Physical Fitness and Sports Training School (Pusat Pendidikan Jasmani (Pusdikjas)) in Cimahi
 Military Police Corps Training School (Pusat Pendidikan Polisi Militer (Pusdikpom)) in Cimahi
 Army Signals Corps Training School (Pusat Pendidikan Perhubungan (Pusdikhub)) in Cimahi
 Territorial Defence Training School (Pusat Pendidikan Teritorial (Pusdikter)) in Bandung
 Logistics and Transportation Training School (Pusat Pendidikan Pembekalan Angkutan (Pusdikbekang)) in Cimahi
 Ordnance Corps Training School (Pusat Pendidikan Peralatan (Pusdikpal)) in Cimahi
 Topography Training School (Pusat Pendidikan Topografi (Pusdiktop)) in Bandung
 Corps of Engineers Training School (Pusat Pendidikan Zeni (Pusdikzi)) in Bogor
 Army Medical School (Pusat Pendidikan Kesehatan (Pusdikkes)) in Jakarta
 Intelligence Training School (Pusat Pendidikan Intelijen (Pusdikintel)) in Bogor
 Adjudant General's Corps Training School (Pusat Pendidikan Ajudan Jenderal (Pusdikajen)) in Lembang
 Army Justice Corps Training School (Pusat Pendidikan Hukum (Pusdikkum)) in Jakarta
 General Military Training School (Pusat Pendidikan Pengetahuan Militer Umum (Pusdikpengmilum)) in Cimahi
 Army Aviation Training School (Pusat Pendidikan Penerbang Angkatan Darat (Pusdikpenerbad)) in Semarang
 Army Scientific and Technological Application Review Agency (Lembaga Pengkajian Teknologi/STTAD (Lemjiantek)) in Bandung
 Indonesian Army Polytechnic (Politeknik Angkatan Darat (Poltekad)) in Malang
 Regional Training Regiments (Resimen Induk Daerah Militer (Rindam)) assigned to all 15 Regional Military Commands of the Army

References

External links 
  

Indonesian Army
1994 establishments in Indonesia